Stockholm i mitt hjärta ("Stockholm In My Heart") is a Swedish vispop song by Lasse Berghagen who wrote it when Ulf Adelsohn wanted a new song about Stockholm when he became governor of Stockholm County in 1992.

Berghagen recorded the song on Svensktoppen on 7 August 1993 and finished in 10th place. Stockholm i mitt hjärta is in Berghagen's albums Sträck ut din hand (1995) and Stockholm, mina drömmars stad (2002).

Stockholm i mitt hjärta is theme music of the music show Allsång på Skansen since 1994, when Berghagen started as host.

References

1992 songs
Songs about Stockholm
Songs written by Lasse Berghagen
Music television series theme songs
Lasse Berghagen songs